Whitchurch was a parliamentary borough in the English County of Hampshire, which elected two Members of Parliament (MPs) to the House of Commons from 1586 until 1832, when the borough was abolished by the Great Reform Act.

History
Whitchurch was one of a number of new boroughs created in the south of England by Queen Elizabeth I. The borough consisted of most of the town of Whitchurch in northern Hampshire, a market town which by the 19th century had shrunk to insignificance. In 1831, the population of the borough was approximately 1,673, and the town contained 261 houses of which 214 were within the borough.

Following a House of Commons decision in 1708, the right to vote was exercised by the freeholders of any tenements which had not been divided since the time of William III (or by their husbands if the freeholder was a woman). Whitchurch was therefore in effect a "burgage" borough (one where the vote was tied to ownership of specific properties). There were still competitive elections around the turn of the 18th century when no one influence was entirely predominant, and it is recorded that in 1685 it was one of the constituencies that King James II thought worth visiting on an electioneering tour soon after his accession. But by 1700 the Duke of Bolton, as the most powerful local landowner, could generally see his preferred candidates elected, and by the middle of the century, as in other burgage boroughs, a majority of the burgages were concentrated in the hands of two owners and Whitchurch had become an utterly secure pocket borough.

By the time of the Great Reform Act the number of "voters" was estimated to be about 84, but there had been no contested election since 1721; only 13 of the burgages were not owned by one of the two patrons, according to Oldfield, writing in 1816. Of course, had there been an election the two proprietors themselves could not have voted more than once; but they would have been able to simply make a temporary conveyance of each property to a reliable deputy, as frequently happened elsewhere, to ensure that their majority share of the ownership was reflected in the voting.

In the 1740s, these "patrons" were John Wallop, 1st Earl of Portsmouth and John Selwyn, who chose one MP each; Selwyn invariably made use of the seat for himself. After Selwyn's death in 1751 his share was inherited by his son-in-law, Thomas Townshend, who used the seat for his son, a rising minister. By the 1770s the former Portsmouth share of the representation was also in Townshend hands, and was used to find a seat for another relative, George Brodrick, 4th Viscount Midleton.

Whitchurch was abolished as a separate constituency by the Reform Act, the town being included in the Northern division of Hampshire thereafter.

Members of Parliament

1584-1640

1640-1832

Notes

References
Robert Beatson, A Chronological Register of Both Houses of Parliament (London: Longman, Hurst, Res & Orme, 1807) 
D Brunton & D H Pennington, Members of the Long Parliament (London: George Allen & Unwin, 1954)
Cobbett's Parliamentary history of England, from the Norman Conquest in 1066 to the year 1803 (London: Thomas Hansard, 1808) 
 Maija Jansson (ed.), Proceedings in Parliament, 1614 (House of Commons) (Philadelphia: American Philosophical Society, 1988) 
 T. H. B. Oldfield, The Representative History of Great Britain and Ireland (London: Baldwin, Cradock & Joy, 1816)
 J Holladay Philbin, Parliamentary Representation 1832 - England and Wales (New Haven: Yale University Press, 1965)
 Edward Porritt and Annie G Porritt, The Unreformed House of Commons (Cambridge University Press, 1903)
Henry Stooks Smith, The Parliaments of England from 1715 to 1847 (2nd edition, edited by FWS Craig - Chichester: Parliamentary Reference Publications, 1973)

Parliamentary constituencies in Hampshire (historic)
Constituencies of the Parliament of the United Kingdom established in 1586
Constituencies of the Parliament of the United Kingdom disestablished in 1832
Rotten boroughs